A taming is a round shield made of wood or tightly-woven rattan traditionally used by the Moro, Lumad, and Visayan people of the Philippines.

See also

Kalasag

References

Shields
Moro people
Weapons of the Philippines